Tilak Nagar is a suburban area and commercial hub in the district of West Delhi, Delhi, India.

Location
Tilak Nagar is situated approximately 20 km from the New Delhi Railway Station and 17 km from Delhi's Indira Gandhi International Airport. It is connected with Delhi Metro via blue line to the commercial hub of Connaught Place and to adjacent cities  Ghaziabad, Gurgaon and Noida making it easy and feasible to commute on a day-to-day basis.

Neighbourhoods
Tilak Nagar is surrounded by suburban localities namely Ajay Enclave, Vishnu Garden, Chand Nagar, Ashok Nagar, Fateh Nagar, Shiv Nagar, Virender Nagar, Shahpura, Sant Nagar, Choukhandi, Ganesh Nagar, Krishna Park and upscale localities namely Janakpuri and Mukherji Park. It is also surrounded by urban colonies namely Choukhandi and Khyala village. A prominent industrial area. above all revenue land of Tihar village  Late Ch Chet Ram-Numberdar 17 village in British Raj.

Government and politics
Tilak Nagar has been a BJP stronghold since 1993, when for the first time Delhi got its own Chief Minister after a period of 37 years of President's rule. The current Member of Legislative Assembly (MLA) from Tilak Nagar Constituency is Jarnail Singh, a candidate from newly formed Aam Aadmi Party emerged victorious after defeating a BJP candidate.

Demographics
Tilak Nagar's population largely consists of Pindi and Pishori Sikhs (Sikhs who migrated to India from cities of Rawalpindi and Peshawar (now in Pakistan) during the Partition of India in 1947). It also has substantial population of Jatts, Ramgharia Sikhs and Punjabi Hindus, many of whom had migrated from modern-day Pakistan during late 1940s. Most of the resident's occupation is business.

Visitors attractions
It is quite popular for its market, offering a wide variety of products such as clothing and consumer durables such as most famous for Punjabi marriage rituals items (like Chura, Lawan Suit, Pagri, kangna, and currency garland etc.).  It has very impressive timber and hardware shops. There is a huge and famous furniture market on Jail Road. Near Tilak Nagar metro station you can enjoy tasty veg and non veg street food. There are many education institutes in its vicinity. It has three cinema halls in its vicinity namely PVR  Vikas Puri and Pacific Mall and Satyam Janak palace. Nearby shopping hubs are Rajouri Garden, Pacific Mall Subhash Nagar, Janakpuri District Center, Uttam Nagar, Vikaspuri PVR complex and Jwala Heri market near Paschim Vihar.

Roadways
Shivaji Marg is the main arterial road of West Delhi that passes through Tilak Nagar. Shaheed Bhagat Singh Marg (commonly known as Jail Road) connects it to Dhaula Kuan and other parts of south Delhi, Outer Ring Road connects it to northern localities of Delhi like Paschim Vihar, Pitampura, Rohini, NH8 and to Wazirabad.

Health facilities
The area supports two hospitals among multiple medical facilities and pharmacies.

References

Neighbourhoods in Delhi
Memorials to Bal Gangadhar Tilak